Sebastián de Belalcázar (1479/1480 – 1551) was a Spanish conquistador. De Belalcázar, also written as de Benalcázar, is known as the founder of important early colonial cities in the northwestern part of South America; Quito in 1534 and Cali, Pasto and Popayán in 1537. De Belalcázar led expeditions in present-day Ecuador and Colombia and died of natural causes after being sentenced to death in Cartagena, at the Caribbean coast in 1551.

Early life 
He was born as Sebastián Moyano in the province of Córdoba, Spain, in either 1479 or 1480. He took the name Belalcázar as that was the name of the castle-town near to his birthplace in Córdoba.  According to various sources, he may have left for the New World with Christopher Columbus as early as 1498.

Americas 

He was an encomendero in Panama in 1522.  He entered Nicaragua with Francisco Hernández de Córdoba in 1524 during the conquest of Nicaragua, and became the first mayor of the city of León in Nicaragua.  He remained there until 1527, when he left for Honduras as a result of internal disputes among the Spanish governors.  Briefly returning to León, he sailed to the coast of Peru, where he united with the expedition of Francisco Pizarro in 1532.

Conquest of modern-day Ecuador 

In 1534, while commanding the settlement of San Miguel for Francisco Pizarro, Sebastian set off to conquer Quito in modern-day Ecuador, without orders from Pizarro.  Quito had been the northernmost city of the Inca Empire, but while Belalcázar defeated the Inca general Rumiñahui, the local population secreted the city treasure away. Belalcázar then founded the new city of Quito with Diego de Almagro and Baltasar Maldonado, honoring Pizarro by naming it in full "San Francisco de Quito".

Conquest of modern-day Colombia 

Moving northward into present day Colombia in search of El Dorado in 1535, he entered the Cauca River Valley, founding the southwestern Colombian cities of  Santiago de Cali in 1536, and Pasto and Popayán (next in importance after Quito) in 1537. Crossing overland to the Magdalena River Valley, he entered the highlands of central Colombia, which had also been reached by Gonzalo Jiménez de Quesada and Nikolaus Federmann, a German, in 1539. The three presented their dispute before King and Holy Roman Emperor Charles V. The King granted Belalcázar rule of the area with the title of governor of Popayán and the honorary title of adelantado in May 1540.  As so often happened among the conquistadors, land squabbles developed again, this time between Belalcázar and Pascual de Andagoya (1495–1548), who also claimed the governorship of Popayán.  Belalcázar successfully defended his lands, and took over some of Andagoya's.  He then intervened in a disagreement between supporters of the families of Pizarro and Almagro in Perú.  In 1546, he ordered the execution of Jorge Robledo, who governed a neighboring province in yet another land-related vendetta. He was put to trial in absentia in 1550, convicted and condemned to death for the death of Robledo, and other offenses pertaining to his constant involvement in the various wars between other conquistadors. A victim of his own ambition, he died in 1551 before he could begin the voyage back to Spain to appeal the decision, in Cartagena, Colombia.

See also 

 List of conquistadors
 List of conquistadors in Colombia

References 

 

15th-century births
1551 deaths
Year of birth uncertain
People from the Province of Córdoba (Spain)
Spanish conquistadors
Andalusian conquistadors
Prisoners sentenced to death by Spain
People sentenced to death in absentia
Spanish prisoners sentenced to death
Colonial Central America
Colonial Peru
History of Ecuador
Colonial Colombia
16th-century Peruvian people
16th-century Spanish people